Two Bits is a 1995 American drama film directed by James Foley and starring Al Pacino, Mary Elizabeth Mastrantonio and Jerry Barone. It was written by Joseph Stefano, who considered the film a personal project, with a semi-biographical story. The title refers to the American slang term "two bits", for a quarter dollar.

Plot

It is a hot summer day in 1933 in South Philadelphia, where 12-year-old Gennaro lives with his widowed mom and his ailing grandfather. His grandfather sits outside holding tight to his last quarter. He has promised the quarter to Gennaro so the boy can buy a ticket to a plush new movie theater. But grandpa is not ready to pass on the quarter or pass on to his final reward. He has some unfinished business with a woman from his past, and he enlists Gennaro to act as his emissary.

Cast
 Jerry Barone as Gennaro
 Mary Elizabeth Mastrantonio as Luisa Spirito
 Al Pacino as Grandpa
 Patrick Borriello as Tullio
 Andy Romano as Dr. Bruna
 Donna Mitchell as Mrs. Bruna
 Mary Lou Rosato as Aunt Carmela
 Joe Grifasi as Uncle Joe
 Rosemary De Angelis as Mrs. Conte
 Ron McLarty as Irish
 Charley Scalies as Ballyhoo Driver
 Joanna Merlin as Guendolina
 Geoff Pierson as Dr. Wilson
 Karen Shallo as Woman in Red
 Nick Discenza as Father of Deceased

Awards
The film was nominated for two Young Artist Awards, Best Family Feature and Best Young Leading Actor (Jerry Barone).

External links
 
 
 

1995 films
1995 drama films
American drama films
Films directed by James Foley
Films set in Philadelphia
Films with screenplays by Joseph Stefano
Films set in 1933
Films scored by Carter Burwell
1990s English-language films
1990s American films